Mitchell Opera House, also known as Mitchell City Hall, is a historic theater building located at Mitchell, Lawrence County, Indiana.  It was built in 1905–1906, and is a two-story, brick building measuring 45 feet wide and 85 feet deep.  It has a one-story projecting entry, gable roof, and gambrel roof over the stage area at the rear of the building.  It housed a theater until 1927, then served as city hall between 1952 and 1979.

It was listed in the National Register of Historic Places in 1981.

References

Theatres on the National Register of Historic Places in Indiana
Theatres completed in 1906
Buildings and structures in Lawrence County, Indiana
National Register of Historic Places in Lawrence County, Indiana
Opera houses on the National Register of Historic Places in Indiana
Opera houses in Indiana
1906 establishments in Indiana